Kirstie Levell (born 7 January 1997) is an English football goalkeeper for FA Women's Super League club Leicester City. She has represented England at under-17, under-19 and under-23 levels.

Club career

Everton
Having been brought up through the Everton youth ranks, Levell made her debut for the first team during the 2015 FA WSL season at the age of 18. She made 16 appearances during her first season and become a regular starter for the Blues. Levell was the starting keeper during the 2017 Spring Series, playing all 9 games and conceding 7 goals as Everton won the WSL 2 title. Following promotion, Everton signed Lizzie Durack to add competition to the goalkeeper group, limiting Levell's minutes. She regained the starting job the following campaign, playing every league game during the 2018–19 season. In the 2019–20 season, Everton signed Finnish international Tinja-Riikka Korpela and England youth international Sandy MacIver, limiting Levell to three League Cup appearances. On 28 May 2020, it was confirmed Levell had left Everton following the expiration of her contract.

Leicester City 
On 22 August, Levell announced her move to FA Women's Championship club Leicester City ahead of the 2020-21 season, amongst a host of new signings to the newly-professional club. Levell selected the shirt number 28, in memory of her late brother, who died on that date in September 2015.

Levell was part of the Leicester City squad that won the 2020/21 FA Women's Championship.

International career 
Levell represented England on the under-17 national team during the 2013 UEFA Women's Under-17 Championship. Levell has also represented the England U-19s at 2014 UEFA Women's Under-19 Championship and England U-23s.

As of 2022, Levell is eligible for Scotland and stated in an interview with Her Football Hub that an international career with Scotland was her preference.

Honours

Club

Everton
 FA WSL 2 Spring Series: 2017

Leicester City
 FA Women's Championship: 2020–21

Individual
 FA Women's Championship Golden Glove: 2020–21 (shared)

References

External links

Living people
English women's footballers
Everton F.C. (women) players
Leicester City W.F.C. players
FA Women's National League players
1997 births
Women's association football goalkeepers
Footballers from Merseyside
Sportspeople from Birkenhead
England women's youth international footballers
English people of Scottish descent